Deanna Troi is a main character in the science-fiction television series Star Trek: The Next Generation and related TV series and films, portrayed by actress Marina Sirtis. Troi is half-human, half-Betazoid, and has the psionic ability to sense emotions. She serves as the ship's counselor on USS Enterprise-D. Throughout most of the series, she holds the rank of lieutenant commander. In the seventh season, Troi takes the bridge officer's examination and is promoted to the rank of commander, but continues as counselor.

Troi appears in all four Next Generation theatrical films, and also made guest appearances on Voyager, Enterprise, Picard, and Lower Decks.

Her romantic interests, family, and personal life are plot elements in many Star Trek: The Next Generation episodes.

Depiction
Deanna Troi was born on March 29, 2336, near Lake El-Nar, Betazed. Troi’s parents are Betazoid Ambassador Lwaxana Troi (portrayed by Majel Barrett) and deceased human Starfleet officer Lt. Ian Andrew Troi (portrayed by Amick Byram). An older sister, Kestra, died in a drowning accident during Troi’s infancy. Although Deanna Troi has little exposure to Earth culture, she attended Starfleet Academy from 2355 to 2359, as well as the University of Betazed, and earned an advanced degree in psychology.

Deanna Troi serves as the ship's counselor aboard the Starfleet starships USS Enterprise (NCC-1701-D) and Enterprise-E under the command of Captain Jean-Luc Picard. In Star Trek: Nemesis, Troi leaves the Enterprise with her new husband William Riker, who has just been promoted to captain of the USS Titan.

Troi's empathic abilities prove key to main shows, and other popular areas are her relationships and sexuality. In "The Child", she gives birth to an alien child.

The Betazoid race has telepathic abilities. Due to her half-human heritage, Troi has only partial telepathic abilities, and as a result, is more of an empath with clairsentience. In Star Trek: Nemesis, Troi has expanded her empathic abilities, as she is able to connect to another psychic and follow that empathic bond to its source. In this instance, her ability enables Enterprise-E to target and hit the Romulan vessel Scimitar, despite the fact that it is cloaked. She is also able to communicate telepathically with her mother and other telepathic Betazoids or races with sufficient aptitude. Several species are resistant to the telepathy and empathy of Betazoids, such as the Ferengi, the Breen, and the Ulians.

Early in the series, Troi finds herself working with a former lover, the newly assigned first officer to USS Enterprise, Commander William Riker. In season one, she meets a potential spouse in "Haven". In later episodes, Troi has romantic involvements with several others, including a brief relationship with Klingon Starfleet officer Lieutenant Worf. A major exploration of their relationship begins with "Parallels", in which Worf encounters parallel universes where they are married with children. Another episode that explores a Troi-Worf relationship is "Eye of the Beholder". However, in both cases, they are not revealed to be dating aboard the "real" ship, although both episodes are oriented towards exploring this concept. In "All Good Things...", the beginnings of real-world relationship are briefly explored, though this is abruptly dropped as Worf explores other love interests in Star Trek: Deep Space Nine, and Troi's romantic relationship with Riker is rekindled through the Next Generation films.

As a main cast member, Troi appears in nearly every TNG episode, though particular episodes, starting with "The Child", feature her as the primary protagonist.  Her name is included in the show title "Ménage à Troi", which is oriented towards an adventure her mother and she have (besides Data and Q, this is one of the few cases where a character's name is in the episode title). Other episodes principally about Troi include: "Face of the Enemy", "Man of the People", "Violations", and "Night Terrors".

She is addressed in various ways by fellow officers. Captain Picard calls her "Counselor", but when he is concerned about her, or in emergencies, he calls her "Deanna". Picard also refers to her as "Commander" in the pilot episode, "Encounter at Farpoint", which is consistent with her uniform's rank pips. Riker addresses her as "Lieutenant" a single time in the pilot episode; her service rank is not referred to again for several seasons. Doctor Crusher (one of her most noted female friends) usually calls her "Troi". Data very rarely calls her by her first name, usually calling her "Counselor Troi". Depending on the situation, Commander Riker calls her "Deanna" or "Imzadi", which means "beloved" in the Betazoid language.

In several episodes, Troi falls victim to aliens. In an episode of season four ("Clues"), the Enterprise’s crew loses a day's memory. As events unfold, Troi is taken over by an entity to communicate with the crew. She temporarily gains "superhuman" strength and effortlessly tosses Worf across the bridge, breaking his wrist. In the season-five episode, "Violations", the Enterprise encounters an alien species who are telepathic and specialize in being able to bring back lost memories. One of the aliens mentally assaults Deanna and also tries to physically assault her in her quarters. She is saved by Worf and one of his security teams. In the film, Star Trek: Nemesis, she is mentally violated by Shinzon's viceroy, who is also telepathic. This occurs in her quarters when she is with her new husband, Commander Riker; it also occurs in the Star Trek: Nemesis bonus deleted scenes, where she is attacked in the turbolift. She eventually is able to turn the tables on the viceroy using the same connection.

Troi is an avid connoisseur of chocolate, a fact that is significant in multiple episodes, including one in which she tells Commander Riker how to properly enjoy eating it. In the episode "Remember Me", Beverly Crusher briefly describes Troi to Captain Picard to jog his memory and mentions that she "loves chocolate". She is known for ordering chocolate-flavored desserts in Ten-Forward, and her love for desserts is a common point of dialogue in many shows. She talks about this with a visiting-alien ambassador in "Liaisons", who takes up her love for desserts as in their culture they do not have this type of food.

Dream-themed episodes include "Phantasms", where Troi appears as cake in Data's dream and in "Night Terrors", her dreams help save the ship. The dreams a suitor thinks he is having about her in "Haven" become a major plot point in that episode.

Development and casting
 
Marina Sirtis at first read for the role that would become Tasha Yar in 1986. She had, in total, five readings, all with Gene Roddenberry and other executives. Notably, Roddenberry took a liking to her almost immediately. Denise Crosby, who eventually won the role of Tasha, auditioned for the role of Deanna Troi. Sirtis was said to have had a more "exotic" feel about her.

She was just about to return home, in debt and jobless, when she received the phone call alerting her that she had the role of Deanna Troi. She stated that if it had been an hour later, she would have missed that call and been on her way to England. Sirtis' US visa was expiring that day, and if she had stayed any longer, she could have run into legal trouble.

For Sirtis, Star Trek was her first big break. Prior to Deanna Troi, her acting career was going nowhere: "What they told us about The Next Generation when we first started was that we were guaranteed 26 episodes. So that was the longest job I've ever had." 

Initially, series creator Gene Roddenberry intended Troi to be "eye candy" - beautiful, sexy, and not very bright. He also conceptualized her as having four breasts, before his wife told him this was a bad idea. Prior to filming, Sirtis was told to lose , but thought to herself that she had to drop even more, and was often wearing plunging necklines and form-fitting dresses. After six years, the producers decided to drop the "sexy and brainless" Troi and make her a stronger character: I was thrilled when I got my regulation Starfleet uniform... it covered up my cleavage and I got all my brains back, because when you have cleavage, you can't have brains in Hollywood... I was allowed to do things that I hadn't been allowed to do for five or six years. I went on away teams, I was in charge of staff, I had my pips back, I had phasers, I had all the equipment again, and it was fabulous. I was absolutely thrilled.

Reception
One reviewer compared her to Leonard McCoy from the original Star Trek television series. In 2018, CBR ranked Counselor Troi as the 25th-best Starfleet character of Star Trek, in 2018; they note her role as an empath aboard Enterprise 1701-D. In 2017, IndieWire ranked Troi as the 9th-best character on Star Trek: The Next Generation.

In 2016, Troi was ranked as the 24th-most important character of Starfleet within the Star Trek  universe by Wired.

In 2017, Screen Rant ranked Troi the 12th-most attractive person in the Star Trek universe.

In 2018, CBR ranked Troi the 25th-best member of Starfleet.

In 2019, Troi was ranked the sixth-sexiest Star Trek character by SyFy.

In 2020, Tom's Guide recommended the Star Trek: The Next Generation episodes "Ménage à Troi", "Face of the Enemy", and "Thine Own Self" as having some of the best moments for this character.

In 2020, SyFy Wire was very positive about her performance in the Star Trek: Picard episode "Nepenthe", explaining that "It features Deanna Troi at her very best, with Marina Sirtis at the height of her powers."

Franchise appearances
Besides being a regular in The Next Generation and its films, Deanna Troi appears in three episodes of Star Trek: Voyager ("Pathfinder", "Inside Man", and "Life Line") together with Reginald Barclay, and in the final episode of Star Trek: Enterprise, "These Are the Voyages...", with William Riker.

Troi appears in the Star Trek: Picard episode "Nepenthe", set twenty years after Nemesis where she is married to Riker and they have two children, Thad (deceased) and Kestra. When Jean-Luc Picard and his android companion Soji visit the Rikers' home, Deanna and her husband welcome them with open arms. Deanna and Will are both retired from Starfleet, although Will is described as being on "active reserve".

Troi appears in the first season finale of the animated Star Trek: Lower Decks, set a year after the events of Nemesis.

See also
 List of Star Trek: The Next Generation cast members

References

External links

Fictional telepaths
Star Trek alien characters
Crossover characters in television
Fictional commanders
Fictional empaths
Fictional extraterrestrial–human hybrids
Fictional people from the 24th-century
Fictional psychologists
Star Trek (film franchise) characters
Star Trek hybrids
Star Trek: Enterprise characters
Star Trek: Picard characters
Star Trek: The Next Generation characters
Star Trek: Voyager characters
Starfleet lieutenant commanders
Starfleet commanders
Starfleet officers
Television characters introduced in 1987

de:Figuren im Star-Trek-Universum#Counselor Deanna Troi